Geological Engineering Department of Selcuk University, Selcuk University Faculty of Engineering and Architecture what is an optional section. Geological Engineering Department is located on the Afyon way to 20th km in Alaeddin Keykubat Campus. Tram and bus transportation between campus and city center are provided with. Geological Engineering Department authorized staff and more than 34 years of knowledge has grown continue to add new ones to 1500 engineers.

History 
The Selcuk University Faculty of Science Department Earth Science began classes in the 1976-1977 school year. In 1982 with the name of Geological Engineering have been connected to the Engineering and Architecture Department.

Academic Structure 
General Geology
Mining Bearings-Geochemistry
Mineralogy-Petrography
Applied Geology

Heads of Department 
 Prof.Dr. Mehmet Ayan
 Prof.Dr. Fikret Kurtman
 Prof.Dr. M.Esat Baskan
 Prof.Dr. Hukmu Orhan
 Prof.Dr. Halil Bas
 Prof.Dr. Yuksel Aydin
 Prof.Dr. Muazzez Celik Karakaya
 Prof.Dr. Huseyin Kurt

External links
Site of Selcuk University Department of Geological Engineering 
Blog of Department
Prof.Dr.Hukmu Orhan's Site
Prof.Dr.Fusun Alkaya's Site
Prof.Dr.Yasar Eren's Site
Ass.Prof.Dr. Guler Gocmez's Site
Ass.Prof.Dr.Ferhat Bayram's Site

Geology education
Universities and colleges in Konya